Pearl Louella Kendrick (August 24, 1890 – October 8, 1980) was an American bacteriologist known for co-developing the first successful whooping cough vaccine alongside fellow Michigan Department of Public Health scientist Grace Eldering and chemist Loney Gordon in the 1930s. In the decades after the initial pertussis vaccine rollout, Kendrick contributed to the promotion of international vaccine standards in Latin America and the Soviet Union. Kendrick and her colleagues also developed a 3-in-1 shot for diphtheria, pertussis, and tetanus called the DTP vaccine which was initially released in 1948.

Early life and education

Pearl Louella Kendrick was born on August 24, 1890 in Wheaton, Illinois, US. She graduated from high school in 1908 and attended Greenville College for a year before transferring to Syracuse University. In 1914, she received her B.S. in Zoology from Syracuse. Kendrick graduated from Johns Hopkins University in 1932 while simultaneously working at the Michigan Department of Public Health as an associate director and chief.

Research
After moving to Michigan for work and graduating from Johns Hopkins, Kendrick began to research whooping cough (pertussis) to try to solve the growing issue of the contagious disease. Based on the statistical data of the time, the disease killed an average of 6,000 people in the United States per year, with the majority (95%) being children.When she moved to Grand Rapids, Michigan, Kendrick worked at the Western Michigan Branch Laboratory of the Michigan Department of Health. It was there that she met Grace Eldering, a fellow scientist at the Department who also had an interest in developing a pertussis vaccine.

Kendrick and Eldering headed the vaccine project through program development, testing, and the eventual inoculation of children with the pertussis vaccine. The pair conducted door-to-door field research where they took samples from sick children in the Grand Rapids area. Eventually, the two used these samples to develop the whooping cough vaccine, which they gave to treatment groups during an experiment known as the "Grand Rapids Trials." In the midst of their research, World War II was also in full effect. This led to many scientific studies facing cessation due to being underfunded. First Lady Eleanor Roosevelt took an interest in Kendrick's and Eldering's work and assisted them with obtaining funds from the Works Progress Administration (WPA). With this added assistance, the development of the vaccine could be continued. As a result of analyzing the data collected from the Trials for nearly 3 years, it was found that the vaccine was a success. Michigan started distributing the vaccines in 1940 and deaths from whooping cough declined. Their work contributed significantly
 to the development of cough plate diagnostics. The collaborative nature of their work within the bacteriological research community and their partnerships with the Grand Rapids public health community are recognized as an important contribution to vaccine research and public health.

Further research and modern implications 
In the following years, Kendrick, Eldering, and Gordan developed a vaccine for diphtheria, pertussis, and tetanus (DPT vaccine). DPT vaccines were the prevailing defense against the three diseases until concerns arose about the safety and efficacy of this vaccine type in the 1980s and 1990s. The DPT vaccine laid the groundwork for new vaccine developments. Subsequently, a molecularly different variation of the DPT vaccine called the DTaP was created and became the principal vaccine for diphtheria, pertussis, and tetanus in the U.S. and abroad.

Later life and death

In 1951, Kendrick retired from the Michigan Department of Public Health. After retiring, she became a faculty member at the University of Michigan's Department of Epidemiology. She retired from the university in 1960. Kendrick served as president of the Michigan American Society for Microbiology. She died on October 8, 1980, in Grand Rapids.

Awards and honors
Kendrick was inducted into the Michigan Women's Hall of Fame Historical Honors Division in 1983.

Notes

References

1890 births
1980 deaths
American bacteriologists
Women bacteriologists
University of Michigan faculty
20th-century American women scientists
20th-century American scientists
American women academics